Jeanne Laisné (born circa 1454 ?) was a French heroine known as Jeanne Fourquet and nicknamed Jeanne Hachette ('Joan the Hatchet'). She was the daughter of a peasant.

She is currently known for an act of heroism on 27 June 1472, when she prevented the capture of Beauvais by the troops of Charles the Bold, Duke of Burgundy. The town was defended by only 300 men-at-arms, commanded by Louis de Balagny.

The Burgundians were making an assault, and one of their number had planted a flag upon the battlements, when Jeanne, axe in hand, flung herself upon him, hurled him into the moat, tore down the flag, and revived the drooping courage of the garrison. In gratitude for this heroic deed, Louis XI instituted a procession in Beauvais called the "Procession of the Assault", and married Jeanne to her chosen lover Colin Pilon, loading them with favours. There is an annual religious procession on the last weekend in June through the streets of Beauvais to commemorate Jeanne's deed.

A statue of her was unveiled on 6 July 1851 (see picture). During the ceremony, the Beauvais poet, Fanny Dénoix des Vergnes (1798-1879) read her poem, Jeanne Hachette, or the siege of Beauvais.

In culture 
She is the tragic figure in the play by the Marquis de Sade, Jeanne Laisné ou le siège de Beauvais published in 1813. It has never been performed. 
She was portrayed in the French film Le Miracle des loups (1924) of Raymond Bernard.
The knight Jenavelle Rolantir who appears in Elf Saga: Doomsday (2014) by Joseph Robert Lewis is inspired by various French heroes, including Roland and Jeanne Hachette.

See also
List of woman warriors in legend and mythology

References

Year of birth uncertain
Year of death unknown
People from Beauvais
15th-century French people
Women in medieval European warfare
Women in war in France
Women in 15th-century warfare